Thaneeru Harish Rao (born 3 June 1972) is an Indian politician serving as the Minister of Medical - Health and Finance Department of Telangana since 08 September 2019. He is the  MLA from Siddipet constituency from the Bharat Rashtra Samithi party since 2004.

Between 2014 and 2018, Rao served as Minister for Irrigation, Marketing & Legislative Affairs of Telangana. With his win at the 2018 assembly election, Rao became the youngest six-time member of any legislative assembly in India. He was appointed as the Minister of Finance in the cabinet expansion held on 8 September 2019.

He was also appointed minister for Health, Medical and Family welfare, on 9 November 2021.

Early life

Rao was born in Chintamadaka, Siddipet, and his native place is Thotapally in Velama Community Family, Karimnagar District to Satyanarayana Rao and Laxmi Bai. His father was a government employee. He studied at Vaniniketan Paathashala. He completed his diploma from Government polytechnic in Hyderabad. He completed his graduation From Kakatiya University.

Personal life
Harish Rao is married to Srinitha Rao. They have two kids, a son, Archishman and a daughter, Vaishnavi.

Political career

Harish Rao started his political journey with Telangana Rashtra Samithi as youth leader. He was elected to assembly at the age of 32 from Siddipet. He raised his strong voice in assembly on various issues of Telangana region. Soon, he became key member of Telangana Rashtra Samithi and started working as Internal party strategist. He along with other MLA's resigned as Congress party delayed the announcement of bifurcation of Telangana. He won as MLA with majority over 58000 though it was major setback for party winning only 7 MLA seats and 2 MP seats out of 17 MLA's and 4 MP's contested. In 2009, he was once again elected as MLA from Siddipet constituency with over 60000 majority. He was elected as TRS party legislative member. Soon after, he and 10 other members from the TRS resigned from the Legislative Assembly in support of a separate State for Telangana. In July 2010, the High Court of Andhra Pradesh ordered the Election Commission of India to conduct by-polls in Siddipet and other towns across the Telangana region. Harish Rao contested again from Siddipet defeating opponent Babu Mohan (from the Telugu Desam Party) yet again.

Harish Rao was elected as MLA for the sixth consecutive time from Siddipet constituency with a whopping majority of 1,20,650 votes in 2018 Elections.

Political statistics 
T. Harish Rao contested as Member of Legislative Assembly from Siddipet.

As Irrigation Minister 
Harish Rao was sworn in as Minister of Irrigation on 2 June 2014. He started Mission Kakatiya program for restoring all the tanks and lakes in Telangana State, India. The program was inaugurated on 12 March 2015 by chief minister Kalvakuntla Chandrashekar Rao. As part of this program, government restored 45,000+ tanks and lakes.

Kaleshwaram Project 

Under Irrigation ministry, TRS government redesigned the project Pranahitha-chevella project on the grounds that the original plan had too many environmental obstacles and had very low water storage provision — only about 16.5 tmc ft. After conducting a highly advanced Light Detection and Ranging (LiDAR) survey for a couple of months, the government separated the original component serving the Adilabad area as the Pranahitha project and renamed the rest as Kaleshwaram by redesigning the head works, storage capacity and the canal system based on the data of availability of water at different locations along the course of the Godavari and its tributaries. The Kaleshwaram project has provision for the storage of about 148 tmc ft with plans of utilising 180 tmc ft by lifting at least 2 tmc ft water every day for 90 flood days. The project is designed to irrigate 7,38,851 hectares (over 18.47 lakh acres) uplands in the erstwhile districts of Karimnagar, Nizamabad, Warangal, Medak, Nalgonda and Ranga Reddy.

Party troubleshooter 
Harish Rao has close association with party cadre. Cadre often refer to him as party troubleshooter. He played key in role during 2014 elections in all Telangana especially in United Medak district and other districts in Northern Telangana. He also took the complete responsibility of by election, 2014: Medak and Narayankhed by elections, TRS party won with huge majority on both the occasions.

References

Andhra Pradesh MLAs 2004–2009
Andhra Pradesh MLAs 2009–2014
Telangana MLAs 2014–2018
Telangana Rashtra Samithi politicians
Living people
People from Medak
1972 births
Siddipet
Kakatiya University alumni
Telangana MLAs 2018–2023